Little Fires may refer to:

 Little Fires Everywhere (novel), 2017 book by Celeste Ng
 Little Fires Everywhere (miniseries),  2020 Hulu series